Kazuki Murakami (born 19 May 1989) is a Japanese diver. He competed in the 2020 Summer Olympics.

Results

References

1989 births
Living people
People from Takarazuka, Hyōgo
Divers at the 2020 Summer Olympics
Japanese male divers
Olympic divers of Japan
Divers at the 2006 Asian Games
Divers at the 2010 Asian Games
Divers at the 2014 Asian Games
Divers at the 2018 Asian Games
21st-century Japanese people